Peter MacNeill is a Canadian film and television actor and voice-over artist who has starred in numerous television series and films.

His film credits have included The Hanging Garden (for which MacNeill won a Genie Award for Best Supporting Actor in 1997), Geraldine's Fortune, Crash, Dog Park, Open Range, A History of Violence, and Regression.

On television, he has had roles in Queer as Folk (as Carl Horvath), Katts and Dog (as Sgt. Callahan), Traders (as Frank Larkin), The Eleventh Hour (as Warren Donohue), PSI Factor: Chronicles of the Paranormal (as Ray Donahue) Call Me Fitz (as Ken Fitzpatrick), and The Good Witch series (as George O'Hanrahan). He is a two-time Gemini Award winner.

In January 2023, he was named the winner of the Academy of Canadian Cinema and Television's Earle Grey Award for lifetime achivement in acting at the 11th Canadian Screen Awards.

Selected filmography

Film

Television

Video Games 

 Tom Clancy's Splinter Cell: Blacklist (2013) as Secretary of Defense

Awards and nominations
1994 Gemini Award for Best Performance by an Actor in a Supporting Role: Gross Misconduct: The Life of Brian Spencer (nominated)
1997 Genie Award for Best Supporting Actor: The Hanging Garden (won)
1998 Gemini Award for Best Performance by an Actor in a Featured Supporting Role in a Dramatic Program of Miniseries: Giant Mine (nominated)
2003 Gemini Award for Best Performance by an Actor in a Supporting Role: The Eleventh Hour (won)
2008 Gemini Award for Best Performance by an Actor in a Featured Supporting Role in a Dramatic Program of Miniseries: Victor (won)
2011 Gemini Award Best Performance by an Actor in a Featured Supporting Role or Guest Role in a Comedic Series: Call Me Fitz (nominated)
2011 Gemini Award Best Ensemble Performance in a Comedy Program or Series: Call Me Fitz (nominated)
2015 Canadian Screen Award for Best Performance by an Actor in a Featured Supporting Role or Guest Role in a Comedic Series: Call Me Fitz (nominated)

References

External links

Canadian male film actors
Canadian male television actors
Canadian male voice actors
Best Supporting Actor Genie and Canadian Screen Award winners
Living people
Year of birth missing (living people)
Male actors from New Brunswick
20th-century Canadian male actors
21st-century Canadian male actors
Best Supporting Actor in a Drama Series Canadian Screen Award winners
Best Supporting Actor in a Television Film or Miniseries Canadian Screen Award winners